Hither Green is a railway station located in Hither Green in the London Borough of Lewisham, south-east London.

It is a busy commuter station with services to several London termini (Cannon Street, Charing Cross and London Bridge) and destinations to other parts of south-east London and the south-east of England (Orpington and Sevenoaks on the South Eastern Main Line, and Dartford and Gravesend on the Dartford Loop Line).

It is in Travelcard Zone 3 and very close to Hither Green Traction Maintenance Depot (TMD), Grove Park Traction and Rolling Stock Maintenance Depot, and Grove Park Safety Training Centre. The station straddles the Prime Meridian, which is marked across the roof of the pedestrian tunnel forming the main entrance.

The station and all trains are operated by Southeastern.

History 

Hither Green station was opened on 1 June 1895, by the South Eastern Railway (SER). It was built at Hither Green junction which had been formed some thirty years earlier. Originally there was a booking hall in Springbank Road which was built to serve the St. Germans Estate. The red brick gateposts are still visible outside the site, which was occupied by a timber merchant for many years, but is now being redeveloped for residential use. The original stationmaster's house survives, at 69 Springbank Road. The main station building was built in Staplehurst Road. Since 1974, access to the new booking hall, located between platforms 4 and 5, has been up a ramp from a foot tunnel which runs between Staplehurst Road and Maythorne Cottages.

In 1899 the SER entered a working relationship known as the South Eastern and Chatham Railway, which managed the station until 1 January 1923, when it became part of the Southern Railway. The Southern Region of British Rail was responsible from nationalisation in 1948 until the regions were completely abolished at the end of 1992.

Accidents and incidents
On 4 September 1934, two freight trains collided at Hither Green.
On 5 November 1967, the Hither Green rail crash occurred. Forty-nine passengers were killed.

Facilities and exits 
There are two exits from Hither Green Station: Fernbrook Road and Springbank Road. The Fernbrook Road exit may be used to reach Hither Green village. There is also a passageway leading out to Maythorne Cottages, which links with Nightingale Grove. The Springbank Road exit may be used for roads to the west of the station including Hither Green Lane. The exit towards the south east end of platform 4 is an exit for authorised personnel only via Hither Green Traction Maintenance Depot (TMD).

While the station has a ticket office, it is not open at all times. Ticket machines are available at all times at the Fernbrook Road exit, between platforms 4 and 5, and – for the Springbank Road exit – halfway along on platform 1. There is a coffee shop on platform 5, and a newsagent near the main ticket office, but again these are not open at all times. The station has toilets (open only when the station is staffed).

Services

Destinations 

Rail services operate from Hither Green station to:
 Lewisham, St Johns, New Cross, London Bridge, Cannon Street, Waterloo East and Charing Cross
 Grove Park (for Sundridge Park and Bromley North), Elmstead Woods, Chislehurst, Petts Wood, Orpington, Chelsfield, Knockholt, Dunton Green, and Sevenoaks
 Lee, Mottingham, New Eltham, Sidcup, Albany Park, Bexley, Crayford, Dartford, Stone Crossing, Greenhithe (for Bluewater), Swanscombe, Northfleet and Gravesend.
 Slade Green, Erith, Belvedere, Abbey Wood, Plumstead, Woolwich Arsenal, Woolwich Dockyard, Charlton, Westcombe Park, Maze Hill, Greenwich, and Deptford.

Frequency 

The typical off-peak service in trains per hour is:

 2 tph to London Cannon Street (all stations except Lewisham)
 4 tph to  via  of which 2 continue to 
 4 tph to  via  of which 2 continue to 

The station is also served by a single peak hour return service between London Blackfriars and Dartford via Sidcup.

Freight yards and motive power depot

The nearby freight yard is an important strategic location for cross-London freight trains. A former motive power depot opened by the Southern Railway in 1933 was closed in 1961 and converted to the Hither Green Traction Maintenance Depot.

Connections
London Buses route 273, London Buses route 225 and London Buses route N171 serve the station.

References

External links 

Southeastern trains
Street Map

Railway stations in the London Borough of Lewisham
DfT Category C2 stations
Former South Eastern Railway (UK) stations
Railway stations in Great Britain opened in 1895
Railway stations served by Southeastern